Lutetium(III) bromide is a crystalline compound made of one lutetium atom and three bromine atoms. It takes the form of a white powder at room temperature. It is hygroscopic. It is odorless.

Properties

Reactions
Lutetium(III) bromide can be synthesized through the following reaction:
2 Lu(s) + 3 Br2(g) → 2 LuBr3(s)

If burned, lutetium(III) bromide may produce hydrogen bromide and metal oxide fumes.

Lutetium(III) bromide reacts to strong oxidizing agents.

Solubility
An experiment by T. Mioduski showed that the solubility of LuBr3 in tetrahydrofuran at 21-23 °C was 0.30 g per 100 ml of solution.

References

Bromides
Lutetium compounds
Lanthanide halides